Madman Across the Water is the fourth studio album by English musician Elton John, released in 1971 through DJM and Uni Records. The album was his third album to be released in 1971, at which point John had been rising to prominence as a popular music artist. John's first progressive rock album, Madman Across the Water contains nine tracks, each composed and performed by John and with lyrics written by songwriting partner Bernie Taupin. Yes keyboardist Rick Wakeman plays Hammond organ on two songs.

There were two singles released from Madman Across the Water, "Levon" and "Tiny Dancer". The album was certified gold in February 1972, followed by platinum in March 1993, and 2× platinum in August 1998 by the RIAA. The album was included in Robert Dimery's 1001 Albums You Must Hear Before You Die. On 10 June 2022, the album was reissued as a deluxe edition for its 50th anniversary, featuring 18 unreleased tracks including demos, outtakes and alternate takes, as well as a 40-page book detailing the album's creation with notes from John and Taupin.

History
The nine tracks were each composed and performed by John and with lyrics written by songwriting partner Bernie Taupin as with his previous material. Unlike John's other studio albums at the time, Madman featured John's touring band (which consisted of bassist Dee Murray and drummer Nigel Olsson) on only a single song, due to producer Gus Dudgeon's lack of faith in the group for studio recordings. Instead, most of the tracks were backed by studio players and string arrangements put together by Paul Buckmaster. Davey Johnstone, who had previously worked with Dudgeon as a part of Magna Carta, was also put on as the main guitarist.

Johnstone, Murray and Olsson would be fully featured in John's next album, Honky Château. Percussionist and later band member Ray Cooper made his first appearance with this album. This was John's last album to be recorded at London's Trident Studios, although subsequent albums would be remixed or overdubbed at Trident. Caleb Quaye and Roger Pope would not play with John again until Rock of the Westies in 1975, following Murray and Olsson's departure from the band.

Title
The album's title song was initially set to be released on John's previous album Tumbleweed Connection, featuring guitarist Mick Ronson as the primary musician; however, it was set aside and was re-recorded for this album, with Johnstone on the guitar. The earlier version was included on the remastered Tumbleweed Connection compact disc.

Dispelling rumours that the song's lyric referred to then US President Richard Nixon, Bernie Taupin had this to say:

Reception

Madman Across the Water was one of John's lowest-charting album efforts. It continued a streak of mediocre performance in the UK for John, peaking at No. 41 on the UK Albums Chart and spending two weeks there. The album fared much better in North America, peaking at No. 8 on the US Billboard Top Pop Albums and later on at No. 10 on the year-end list of 1972.

The album received Gold by the RIAA in February 1972, achieving $1 million in sales at wholesale value just in the United States. In 1993, the album was certified Platinum, representing shipments of more than one million units in the US. In 1998, the album was certified Multi-Platinum, representing shipments of over two million units in the US. In May 2017 the album was certified Silver for sales of 60,000 units by the British Phonographic Industry.

On release, Alex Dubro of Rolling Stone was not especially enthusiastic about Madman Across the Water, who found it inferior to its two predecessors. Although he commended "Tiny Dancer" and "Levon", he found the lyrics throughout the record confusing, concluding that it is a "difficult, sometimes impossibly dense record" that would not upset John's current fans, but not gain new ones either. On the other hand, Penny Valentine was more positive in Sounds magazine, describing John as "a music man of immense feeling and power" that is full of unexplored talent.

When it was released in 'The Classic Years' collection, it was the first album not to feature any bonus tracks. One known track recorded at the time, "Rock Me When He's Gone", was released on the 1992 compilation Rare Masters. The song was written for and recorded by one of John's long-time friends, Long John Baldry. It was later remastered for the 50th anniversary deluxe edition.

Madman was John's first foray into progressive rock, and it did not sell well. His next album, Honky Château, shifted gears to glam rock, beginning a string of more successful releases. He did not touch upon prog rock again until Blue Moves in 1976, another less popular album. Madman was helped in North America by FM radio deejays willing to play the lengthy singles, unlike BBC Radio 1.

Covers 
Alice in Chains member Jerry Cantrell covered the closing track "Goodbye" for his third solo album Brighten and told Wall of Sound that John gave his approval for his rendition revealing he said "absolutely you should put it on the record. You got my permission. You did a great version."

Track listing

Original release
 

Note
The SACD version of the album contained a longer version of "Razor Face", which extended the song-ending jam to 6:42 instead of the early fade on the original album. This extended version can only be heard in the 5.1 surround mix, or on the 50th Anniversary reissue of the album.

50th Anniversary Deluxe Edition

Personnel
Track numbers refer to CD and digital releases of the album.
 Elton John – acoustic piano, vocals
 Brian Dee – harmonium (2)
 Rick Wakeman – Hammond organ (3 & 7) 
 Jack Emblow – accordion (3)
 Diana Lewis – ARP synthesizer (4, 7)
 Caleb Quaye – electric guitar (1, 2, 3), acoustic guitar (6)
 B. J. Cole – steel guitar (1)
 Davey Johnstone – acoustic guitar (1, 4, 7), mandolin (6), sitar (6)
 Chris Spedding – electric guitar (4), slide guitar (7)
 David Glover – bass guitar (1, 3, 6)
 Brian Odgers – bass guitar (2)
 Herbie Flowers – bass guitar (4, 5, 7)
 Chris Laurence – double bass (5)
 Dee Murray – bass guitar (8), backing vocals (1, 6, 7)
 Roger Pope – drums (1, 3, 6)
 Barry Morgan – drums (2)
 Terry Cox – drums (4, 5, 7)
 Nigel Olsson – drums (8), backing vocals (1, 6, 7)
 Ray Cooper – percussion (4), tambourine (7, 8)
 Paul Buckmaster – orchestral arrangements and conductor (1, 2, 4, 5, 6, 8, 9)
 David Katz – orchestra contractor (1, 2, 4, 5, 6, 8, 9)
 Tony Burrows – backing vocals (1, 6, 7)
 Roger Cook – backing vocals (1, 6, 7)
 Lesley Duncan – backing vocals (1, 6, 7)
 Barry St. John – backing vocals (1, 6, 7)
 Terry Steele – backing vocals (1, 6, 7)
 Liza Strike – backing vocals (1, 6, 7)
 Sue and Sunny – backing vocals (1, 6, 7)
 Cantores em Ecclesia Choir – choir (8)
 Robert Kirby – choir director (5, 8)

Production 
 Gus Dudgeon – producer, liner notes
 Robin Geoffrey Cable – engineer
 Tony Cousins – remastering
 Gus Skinas – editing
 Ricky Graham – digital transfers
 Greg Penny – surround sound
 Crispin Murray – assistant
 David Larkham – art direction, design, illustrations, photography, cover photo
 Gill – artwork
 Yanis – artwork
 Bob Gruen – photography
 John Tobler – liner notes

Charts

Weekly charts

Year-end charts

Certifications

References

External links

Elton John albums
1971 albums
Albums arranged by Paul Buckmaster
Albums produced by Gus Dudgeon
Albums recorded at Trident Studios
DJM Records albums
Uni Records albums
Progressive rock albums by English artists